Kenneth Barner from the University of Delaware, Newark, DE was named Fellow of the Institute of Electrical and Electronics Engineers (IEEE) in 2016 for contributions in nonlinear signal processing.

References 

Fellow Members of the IEEE
Living people
Year of birth missing (living people)
American electrical engineers